Jean Dumont (10 October 1923, in Lyon – July 2001) was a French historian and publisher.

Career overview
Dumont graduated in history and philosophy at the University of Lyon and in law in Paris. His specialty was Church history; he also studied Spanish social and religious history of the 15th and 16th centuries. He worked as editor for several publishing companies such as Amiot-Dumont (1947 – 1959), Grasset, François Beauval, Club des Amis du Livre and Famot.

Works
 Erreurs sur le "Mal Français", ou le trompe-l'oeil de M. Peyrefitte (1979).
 Proces Contradictoire de l'Inquisition Espagnole (1983).
 L'Église au Risque de l'Histoire (1984; rep. in 2002 with a preface by Pierre Chaunu).
 La Révolution Française ou Les Prodiges du Sacrilège (1984).
 Pourquoi nous ne Célèbrerons pas 1789 (1987).
 Petit Voyage en Théomarxie: Bref Examen Critique de "Théo", la "Nouvelle Encyclopédie Catholique" (1990).
 L'Heure de Dieu sur le Nouveau Monde (1991).
 L'Incomparable Isabelle la Catholique (1992).
 La Vraie Controverse de Valladolid (1995).
 Lepante, l'Histoire Étouffée (1997).

Miscellany
 Les Coups d'Etats (1963).
 Une Croix sur le Nouveau Monde (1992).
 "Les Causes de la Persécution Religieuse." In: L’Envers des Droits de l’Homme (1993).
 "Aux Origines de la Laïcité, les Zones d'Ombre de l'Histoire de France." In: Qui a Peur du Baptême de Clovis? (1997).
 La Croix et le Croissant (2001).
 Repentance Pourquoi Nous Ne Demandons Pas Pardon (2003).

External links
 Renaissance Catholique

1923 births
2001 deaths
Writers from Lyon
Historians of France
University of Lyon alumni
French male non-fiction writers
20th-century French historians
20th-century French male writers